The Guangdong Tree Park located in Guangzhou is an arboretum managed by the Guangdong Academy of Forestry. The park is home to over 1,100 species of trees including 56 kinds of nationally protected species of trees and 12 provincially protected species of trees. The park covers 20 hectares of land in the Longdong section of Tianhe district and is nearby to the South China Botanical Garden.

References

External links
 English Homepage
 Chinese Homepage

Botanical gardens in Guangdong
Guangzhou